The Uganda Human Rights Commission (UHRC) serves to monitor and advance human rights in Uganda. The UHRC is a body established under the 1995 Constitution Article 51 under the Bill of Rights found in Chapter four of the Constitution. It is based on the Paris Principles which are the guidelines for the establishment of a national human rights institution. Its mandate is spelled out in Article 52 of the Constitution.

Location
The national headquarters of UHRC are located at 4929 Buganda Road, on Nakasero Hill, in Kampala, Uganda's capital and largest city.

Composition
The Commission is composed of a Chairperson, and not less than three other persons, appointed by the President with the approval of Parliament. As of 2009, there were seven commissioners. The Chairperson at that time was the late Meddie Kaggwa (1955–2019). Members of the Commission have to be persons of high moral character and proven integrity. They serve for a period of six years and are eligible for re-appointment.

Commission chairpersons
The late Meddie Ssozi Kaggwa, replaced Margaret Sekaggya in 2009. As of November 2019, the position of Chairman is vacant, following the death of Kaggwa, on 20 November 2019.

International status
The UHRC is accredited with "A status" by the International Co-ordinating Committee of National Human Rights Institutions (ICC), giving it enhanced access to the United Nations human rights system. It is also a member of the Network of African National Human Rights Institutions.

References

External links
Uganda Human Rights Commission Webpage

The role of the Uganda Human Rights Commission in promoting civic education: A case study of Mbarara and Moroto Districts Thesis for the partial fulfilment of requirements for Master of Laws degree at Makerere University. Author: Okwong, Dorothy. Date:November 2012.

Human rights organisations based in Uganda
National human rights institutions
1995 establishments in Uganda
Organizations established in 1995